JournalSeek is an online database covering academic journals. It includes journals published by over 5400 publishers. The database includes journal descriptions and links to the journals' homepages.

See also
 List of academic databases and search engines

References

External links 
 

Bibliographic databases and indexes
Online databases